Atoma may refer to:

 Atoma (album), a 2016 album by Dark Tranquillity
 Atoma, an enemy planet in the 1951 film Captain Video: Master of the Stratosphere
 Atoma, a private brand of Proxim pharmacies in Quebec
 atoma (plural of Greek atomon) in Atomism, meaning “indivisible”, a term coined by Democritus
 Atoma, a Belgian manufacturer of the disc-binding notebook system